The 59th Massachusetts General Court, consisting of the Massachusetts Senate and the Massachusetts House of Representatives, met in 1838 during the governorship of Edward Everett. Myron Lawrence served as president of the Senate and Robert Charles Winthrop served as speaker of the House.

The governor spoke to the members on January 9, 1838.

"In February 1838, Angelina Grimké became the first woman in U.S. history to address the members of an American legislative body when she spoke to the members of the Massachusetts Legislature.  Her subject was the demand for the immediate end of the slave trade in Washington, D.C."

In 1838, temperance activists pushed the Massachusetts legislature to pass a law restricting the sale of alcohol in quantities less than fifteen gallons.

Senators

Representatives

See also
 25th United States Congress
 List of Massachusetts General Courts

References

External links
 
 

Political history of Massachusetts
Massachusetts legislative sessions
massachusetts
1838 in Massachusetts